is a shōjo manga series by Toru Fujieda. It was published in Japan by Akita Shoten starting in April 2004, and continuing for six tankōbon volumes until its conclusion in May 2006. The series was licensed by CMX manga for an English language release in North American starting in June 2006.

Plot 
Tsubame is a young teenage boy searching for his one true, Agemaki. When he meets Kanoko, a girl with a birthmark of a butterfly on her left hand, he believes that she is Agemaki. Kanoko doesn't believe it at first, but they meet several other teenagers with similar birthmarks and stories. As the series progresses, she begins to fall in love with Tsubame, only to learn that he may not be her soul mate after all.

Media
Oyayubihime Infinity was first serialized in Princess magazine. The individual chapters were published in six tankōbon volumes by Akita Shoten starting on 	April 1, 2004 and continuing until May 16, 2006.

The series was licensed by CMX manga for an English language release in North American when began releasing the series in 2006, shortly before its conclusion in Japan.

Volume list

References

External links
 

2004 manga
Akita Shoten manga
Comedy anime and manga
CMX (comics) titles
Romance anime and manga
Shōjo manga
Supernatural anime and manga